Sharples is an unincorporated community in Logan County, West Virginia, United States. Sharples has a post office with ZIP code 25183.

Sharples was the location of a small firefight in the events leading up to the Battle of Blair Mountain.

References

Unincorporated communities in Logan County, West Virginia
Unincorporated communities in West Virginia